Dan Mihai Roman (born 23 December 1985) is a Romanian footballer who plays as a striker for Liga III club Viitorul Cluj. In his career, Roman also played for teams such as Gloria Bistrița, Gaz Metan Mediaș, FC Botoșani or CFR Cluj, among others.

References

External links
 
 

1985 births
Living people
Sportspeople from Cluj-Napoca
Romanian footballers
Association football defenders
Liga I players
Liga II players
Liga III players
ACF Gloria Bistrița players
ASA 2013 Târgu Mureș players
CS Gaz Metan Mediaș players
FC Botoșani players
FC Politehnica Iași (2010) players
CFR Cluj players
SCM Râmnicu Vâlcea players
FC UTA Arad players
FC Hermannstadt players